Mike Holt (15 September 1931 – 19 July 2008) born Antione Michael Holthausen in Pretoria was a South African professional middle/light heavy/heavyweight boxer of the 1950s and '60s who won the South African middleweight title, and South African light heavyweight title, and drew with Johnny Halafihi for the vacant British Commonwealth light heavyweight title. Holt won the South African middleweight title from Eddie Thomas, and successfully defended the title against Thomas (twice), Cocky Bredenkamp, Jimmie Elliott, and Stoffel du Plessis.

Outside of boxing
Mike Holt appeared as 'Punchy' in Kimberley Jim, the 1965 South African musical comedy film directed by Emil Nofal and starring Jim Reeves.

References

External links

Image - Mike Holt

1931 births
2008 deaths
Heavyweight boxers
Light-heavyweight boxers
Middleweight boxers
Sportspeople from Pretoria
Place of death missing
South African male boxers